Harrison Tare Okiri, better known by his stage name Harrysong, is a Nigerian singer, songwriter and instrumentalist who rose to fame after his tribute song to Nelson Mandela won the "Most Downloaded Callertune Award" at The Headies 2013. Harrysong was born in Warri, Delta State, Nigeria to Ijaw parents but moved to Lagos in 2007 after spending some of his early life in Port Harcourt. Prior to signing to QuestionMark Entertainment, Harrysong used to perform at night clubs until he met Kcee who introduced him to top music personalities. In 2014, Harrysong was nominated in the "Best Pop/R&B Artist of the Year" category at the 2014 Nigeria Entertainment Awards after the release of his chart-topping song "Beta Pikin".

Early life
Harrysong was born as the only child to  Ijaw parents in Warri, Delta State. After the death of his mother, a strained relationship between him and his step-mother led to his drop-out from school and his involvement with music grew after moving to Port Harcourt.

Career
At age eleven, Harrysong's music career started as a congarist in the church his mother served as the music director before he went on to learn contemporary gospel music. In 2007, he moved to Lagos as the lead singer of a live band who perform in night clubs until he met Kcee which led to him signing for Five Star Music. His rise to fame came when he released the single "I'm In Love" and "Taiye & Kehinde" with the music video of the former topping music video charts including Trace TV. He went on to release his debut album Testify through QuestionMark Entertainment in 2012. However, just before the coronavirus entered Nigeria he released a new song titled Bumbumbum which he teamed up with Davido.

Personal life
On June 22, 2017, Harrysong welcome twins with Alexer Perez Gopa named (boy; Perez & girl; Tare). On February 4, 2021, he confirms his engagement with Alexer Perez Gopa on his Instagram page, and they both got married on March 27, 2021, in Warri.

Discography

Albums
Testify (2012)
Kingmaker (2017)
" Right About Now Ep (2020)

Selected singles
"I'm in Love"
"I Want You (Gyptian cover)"
"Obu Ego (Hustle)"
"Taiye & Kehinde"
"I'm in Love Remix"(featuring Olamide)
"When She Loves"
"Better Pikin"
"Kolombo"
"Ofeshe"
"Reggae Blues"(featuring Olamide, Iyanya, Kcee, Orezi)
"Baba for the girls"(featuring Kcee)
"Arabanko"
"Comsa"
"Under The Duvet"
"Happiness"
"Selense"
"Tekero"
"Report Card"
"Chacha" (Remix) (featuring Zlatan ibile)
"Kona ft Rudeboy
"Piompiompiom

Awards and nominations

References

Living people
21st-century Nigerian male singers
Musicians from Warri
Year of birth missing (living people)